The Jordan Media Institute (JMI)  Is a non-profit educational entity in Amman, Jordan focusing on journalism.

MA in Journalism and New Media
JMI offers a practical master's degree in journalism and New Media in cooperation with University of Jordan in accordance with the academic agreement between the two institutions. An intensive professional development and training program catering to industry needs. The MA program has two tracks, a one–year Comprehensive track and a Thesis track. While JMI's language of instruction is Arabic, some classes and guest lectures are offered in English.

Jordanian media credibility
Akeed is part of the King Abdullah II Fund for Development's  Democratic Empowerment Programme (Demoqrati)  that adopted a series of criteria to verify news published by local media outlets.

Media and information literacy
The institute is working on enhancing media literacy in Jordan and spreading the concepts and skills of positive interaction with the media and tools of communication technology and digital media, and to reduce their disadvantages.
Main goals are improving the capabilities of society, especially new and young generations in dealing with the media and information sources and strengthening the capacity of young people to participate positively through the media, especially digital.

Journalism training programs

JMI held specialized training programs and workshops that provide professionals and students with the fundamentals of journalism.

JMI trainings held in partnership with:
 UNESCO United Nations Educational, Scientific and Cultural Organization
 International Center for Journalists located in Washington, D.C., United States
 DW Akademie
 Forum of Federations
 European Union
 Ministry of Foreign Affairs (Norway)
 Canadian International Development Agency
 Arab League Educational, Cultural and Scientific Organization (ALECSO) located in Tunis
 UNICEF United Nations International Children's Emergency Fund
 Deutsche Gesellschaft für Internationale Zusammenarbeit GIZ
 Forum of Federations
 King Abdullah II Fund for Development
 International Labour Organization
 The Norwegian Institute of Journalism
 United States Agency for International Development (USAID).

Founder of JMI
JMI was founded by Princess Rym Ali on August 14, 2006 and was officially established in February 2010.

References

 Jordan Media Institute
 JMI Journalists

External links
 JMI website

Jordanian journalism organisations
Universities and colleges in Jordan
Journalism schools in Asia
Education in Amman
2006 establishments in Jordan